The Arcola Carnegie Public Library is a Carnegie library located at 407 E. Main St. in Arcola, Illinois. The library was built in 1905 through a $10,000 grant from the Carnegie Foundation. Architect Paul O. Moratz designed the library in the Classical Revival style. The building's front entrance is situated within a Classical gabled portico supported by stone pilasters. The hipped roof of the building features an ornamental cornice along its edge and a cupola at its peak. The building still serves as Arcola's public library and houses a collection of over 18,000 books.

The library was listed on the National Register of Historic Places in 2002.  It is one of two sites on the National Register in Douglas County, along with the Streibich Blacksmith Shop in Newman.

Notes

External links

Arcola Public Library District

Library buildings completed in 1905
Buildings and structures in Douglas County, Illinois
Carnegie libraries in Illinois
Education in Douglas County, Illinois
National Register of Historic Places in Douglas County, Illinois
Public libraries in Illinois
Libraries on the National Register of Historic Places in Illinois
1905 establishments in Illinois